Brian Andrew Fowler (born 13 September 1962) is a retired cyclist who represented New Zealand at four consecutive Summer Olympics, starting in 1984. In 1983 he rode Paris–Nice finishing 43rd.

He won six medals (one gold, four silvers, one bronze) at four consecutive Commonwealth Games. Fowler's finest hour came when he won the gold medal in the men's team time trial at the 1990 Commonwealth Games.

Fowler won the Tour of Southland a record eight times. He also holds the record for number of wins in the Tour of Wellington, with four consecutive successes.

In February 2021 suffered a series of Myocardial infarctions requiring extensive hospitalization.

Major results
Source:

1982
 2nd   1982 Commonwealth Games Team Pursuit
1985
 1st  Overall Tour of Southland
 1st Overall Dulux Tour of the North Island

1986
 2nd   1986 Commonwealth Games Road race
 1st  Overall Tour of Southland
 1st Manx International GP
1987
 1st  Overall Tour of Southland
 2nd National Road Race Championships
1988
 1st  National Road Race Championships
 1st  Overall Tour of Southland
 2nd Overall Tour de Beauce 
1989
 1st  National Road Race Championships
 1st  Overall Tour of Southland
 1st  Overall Tour of Wellington
1990
 1st  1990 Commonwealth Games Team Time Trial
 2nd   1990 Commonwealth Games Road race
 1st  Overall Tour of Southland
 1st  Overall Tour of Wellington
 1st Overall Examiner Tour of the North
1991
 1st Overall Hessen Rundfahrt
 1st  Overall Tour of Wellington
1992
 1st  Overall Tour of Southland
 1st  Overall Tour of Wellington
1994
 2nd   1994 Commonwealth Games Road race
 3rd  1994 Commonwealth Games Team Time Trial
 1st Overall Sachsen Tour 
 2nd National Road Race Championships
 1995
 1st  National Time Trial Championships
 1st  Overall Tour of Southland
1996
 2nd National Time Trial Championships
1997
 2nd National Road Race Championships
2002
 1st Stage 3 Tour of Southland
2004
 3rd Main Divide Cycle Race
2005
 1st Le Race
 2nd Main Divide Cycle Race

References

External links
 

1962 births
Living people
New Zealand male cyclists
Cyclists at the 1984 Summer Olympics
Cyclists at the 1988 Summer Olympics
Cyclists at the 1992 Summer Olympics
Cyclists at the 1996 Summer Olympics
Olympic cyclists of New Zealand
Commonwealth Games gold medallists for New Zealand
Commonwealth Games silver medallists for New Zealand
Cyclists at the 1982 Commonwealth Games
Cyclists at the 1986 Commonwealth Games
Cyclists at the 1990 Commonwealth Games
Cyclists at the 1994 Commonwealth Games
Cyclists from Christchurch
Commonwealth Games bronze medallists for New Zealand
Commonwealth Games medallists in cycling
New Zealand track cyclists
20th-century New Zealand people
21st-century New Zealand people
Medallists at the 1982 Commonwealth Games
Medallists at the 1986 Commonwealth Games
Medallists at the 1990 Commonwealth Games
Medallists at the 1994 Commonwealth Games